Vanambadi is an Indian musical television series. The show premiered first on 30 January 2017 on Asianet channel and streaming on Disney+ Hotstar and last episode aired on 18 September 2020. The show features Saikiran Ram, Chippy Renjith, Gouri P
Krishnan and others. It marks the debut of Telugu actor Sai Kiran in the Malayalam industry. It is the official remake of the Bengali language series Potol Kumar Gaanwala.

Synopsis
Mohan Kumar, a budding singer falls in love with Nandini, a normal village girl. They get secretly married. However, Mohan is forced to choose between music and Nandini. He chooses the former and abandons Nandini. Mohan marries a wealthy woman named Padmini "Puppy" Menon, unaware that Nandini is pregnant.

Padmini gives birth to Thampuru, and Nandini gives birth to Anugraha "Anu". Thampuru is a spoilt brat. While Anugraha, just like her father, loves music. Nandini lives with her brother Nandu and sister in law Bhadra who dislike her. Eventually, Anu is seen to be a great fan of Mohan and goes to meet him. Nandini, gets hit by a car and is hospitalized. Anu collects money for her mother's treatment only to be devastated to know that Nandini has died.

Anu wanders off alone, dressed up as a boy, where she reaches Mohan's home where Every members, except Padmini, Thampuru and her parents becomes fond of Anu by her musical talent. Mohan's brother Chandran and his wife Nirmala decides to adopt Anu. Padmini gets to know about Anu's true identity and reveals it to all. Meanwhile, Bhadra realises her mistakes and enters Sreemangalam house as a housemaid named Kalyani, Anu recognises her. Kalyani (Bhadra) too starts supporting Anu.

The rest of the story hurdles about Anu's life in that house. Including, the friend-foe relationship between Anu and Thampuru. Mohan and Anu starts to get closer where Mohan realise that Anu is his daughter. Thampuru discovers that Anu is her half sister. Anu and Thampuru get even more closer.

However, the series ends, as Padmini realises her mistakes. Guilt-ridden, Padmini leaves the house after leaving a message, to Mohan and Thampuru and asks Anu for forgiveness. Mohan, Thampuru and Anu are much worried about her, as they wait in a hope that she will return.

Cast

Saikiran Ram as Mohankumar / Mohanakrishnan
Chippy Renjith as Nandini Mohankumar, Anumol's mother
Gouri P Krishnan as Anugraha Mohankumar/Anumol/Anumon/Gouri
Suchithra Nair as Padmini "Puppy" Mohankumar
Sona Jelina as Thampuru Mohankumar & Aiswarya Maheendran (Dual role) 
Balu Menon as Chandrakumar / Chandrasekharan / Chandran
Uma Nair as Nirmala "Nimmy" Chandran
Mohan Ayroor as Meledath Viswanathan Menon, Padmini's father
Pria Menon as Rukmini Viswanathan, Padmini's mother
Indira Thampi as Sreemangalath Devakiyamma, Mohan and Chandran's mother
Rajkumar as DYSP Jayaraj / Jayan, Padmini's uncle
Seema G. Nair as Bhadra / Kalyani, Anumol's aunt
Saji Surya as Driver Sudevan
Nandu Pothuval as Nandagopan / Nandan / Nandu Maman, Anumol's uncle
Rajeev Parameshwar as Maheendran / Mahi, Thamburu's real father
Anusree Chembakassery as Archana Maheendran / Achu
Divya Jayish Nair as Nandini (governess)
Manu Varma as Doctor GK, Mohan's friend
Indulekha as Devi Teacher
J. Pallassery as Kalappurakkal Madhavan, Nirmala's father
Girija Preman as Yashodhamma, Nirmala's mother
Deepika Mohan as Maheswariyamma, Maheendran's mother
Vipin James as Pramod Krishnan
Ravikrishnan Gopalakrishnan as Simon
Santhosh Keshavan as Vijayanandan
Hareendran as Vinod
Yathikumar as Ananthan / Anantha Moorthi
Kailas Nath as Vasudevan / Vasu Annan, Menon's Karyasthan
J Padmanabhan Thampi as Venugopalan Thampi / Thampi Annan, Temple Committee President 
Kottayam Rasheed as Mamachan, mechanic
Anand Thrissur as Suresh
Raghavan as Devan (Anumol's Swami Muthashan)
Geetha Nair as Lakshmi Devan
Sharika Menon as Priya Suresh
Neeraja as Neeraja, Nirmala's sister
Biji Raj as Satheeshan, Neeraja's husband
Baby Megha Mahesh as Neeraja's and Satheeshan's daughter 
F.J. Tharakan as Jacob Tharakan
Rajmohan as SI Rajmohan
Sindhu Varma as Mamachan's wife
Sreekala as Karthiyayani
Kaladharan as Swami
Amboori Jayan as Jayanthan
Thirumala Ramachandran as Balan
Kuttyedathi Vilasini
Manu Gopinathan as Balu
 Sachin SG as Sumesh
 Achu Sugandh as Pappikunju
 Nariyapuram Venu

Notes
It is the second Musical series in Malayalam language after Paatukalude Paatu On Surya TV.

Soundtrack

Awards and nominations

References

2017 Indian television series debuts
Malayalam-language television shows
Asianet (TV channel) original programming